Elections to Dorset County Council were held on 5 May 2005, alongside other local elections across the United Kingdom. All 45 seats were up for election. The Conservative Party retained control of the council.

Results

References 

2005 English local elections
Dorset County Council elections
2000s in Dorset